The North European Table Tennis Championships 2022 were played in Druskininkai, Lithuania from 5 to 7 August 2022. Lithuania hosted championships for the first time after 20 years gap, previously hosting championships in 2002.

Participating nations 

 (7)
 (7)
 (7)
 (4)
 (11)
 (20)
 (8)
 (7)

Medal summary

Medal table

Medallists

References

External links 
 Official website

North European Table Tennis Championships
North European Table Tennis Championships
Table Tennis Championships